Bryan Keith Hitt (born January 5, 1954, Center, Texas) is an American rock drummer who is currently drumming for the band REO Speedwagon.

Hitt was born in Wooster, Ohio on January 5, 1954. Prior to his involvement with REO Speedwagon, Hitt played with Cher, Graham Nash, and The Spencer Davis Group. He also recorded with Nick Gilder, Gary Busey and Wang Chung.

He joined REO's lineup in 1989 for the release of the 1990 album The Earth, a Small Man, His Dog and a Chicken. Since that time Hitt has played on three more studio albums with the group: Building the Bridge (1996), Find Your Own Way Home (2007) and Not So Silent Night...Christmas with REO Speedwagon (2009).

References

External links

 

American rock drummers
1954 births
Living people
People from Center, Texas
REO Speedwagon members
American rock percussionists
20th-century American drummers
American male drummers
20th-century American male musicians